The 2009 World Mixed Doubles Curling Championship was held April 18–25, 2009 in Cortina d'Ampezzo, Italy at the Cortina d'Ampezzo Curling Arena.

Teams

Round robin

Results

Blue group

April 19
08:00

16:00

17:45

April 20
08:00

14:30

21:00

April 21
08:00

11:15

14:30

17:45

21:00

April 22
08:00

11:15

14:30

17:45

21:00

April 23
11:15

Red group

April 19
11:15

17:45

21:00

April 20
11:15

17:45

April 21
8:00

11:15

14:30

17:45

21:00

April 22
11:15

17:45

April 23
8:00

14:30

Green group

April 19
08:00

11:15

14:30

17:45

21:00

April 20
08:00

11:15

14:30
17:45

21:00

April 21
8:00

11:15

14:30

17:45

21:00

April 22
08:00

14:30

21:00

April 23
08:00

11:15

14:30

Tiebreaker
April 23, 19:00

Playoffs

Semifinal challenge 1
April 24, 09:00

Semifinal challenge 2
April 24, 13:00

Brackets

Semifinals
April 24, 18:00

Bronze-medal game
April 25, 12:00

Gold-medal game
April 25, 12:00

References

External links
Official site

World Mixed Doubles Curling Championship, 2009
World Mixed Doubles Curling Championship
Sport in Cortina d'Ampezzo
2009 in Italian sport
International curling competitions hosted by Italy